Chattowal is a small village approximately 7 km from the city of Tanda in district Hoshiarpur, Punjab, India. Its tehsil is Dasuya. Its current Sarpanch is Smt. Naranjan Kaur.

References

External links 
FaceBook link.
Google map of the village.

Villages in Hoshiarpur district